The Sami Rohr Prize for Jewish Literature is an annual prize awarded to an outstanding literary work of Jewish interest by an emerging writer. Previously administered by the Jewish Book Council, it is now given in association with the National Library of Israel.

History
In 2006, the family of Jewish philanthropist Sami Rohr honored his lifelong love of Jewish learning and great books by establishing the Sami Rohr Prize for Jewish Literature on his 80th birthday.

The annual award, alternating between fiction and non-fiction, seeks to promote writings of Jewish interest, and to encourage the examination of Jewish values among "emerging" writers.

The $100,000 Prize honors an author whose work demonstrates potential for future contribution to the world of Jewish literature. All winners, Choice Award recipients, finalists, judges and advisors are Fellows in the Sami Rohr Jewish Literary Institute. The winner and finalists are honored at an awards ceremony for fiction in New York; the event for non-fiction takes place in Jerusalem.

The $100,000 prize is among the richest literary prizes in the world.

Eligibility and selection
Works are sought and nominated, with specific guidelines, by an advisory panel. The winner and finalists are selected by an independent group of judges, and all deliberations are strictly confidential. The Rohr family has no input or participation in the nomination or selection process.

From 2007 through 2019, the runner-up award was called the Sami Rohr Prize for Jewish Literature Choice Award. The Choice Award was discontinued in 2020. Three finalists each receive a monetary prize of $5,000.

Translated works are eligible. Eligible non-fiction works are restricted to the domains of biography, history, Jewish current affairs, Jewish scholarship, or contemporary Jewish life.

Finalists and winners
The gold medal marks the winner, while the silver medal marks the runner-up.

2022 
The nominees were announced on April 26, 2022. The winners were announced on May 19, 2022.

  Plunder: A Memoir of Family Property and Nazi Treasure by Menachem Kaiser
 From Africa to Zion: The Shepherd Boy Who Became Israel’s First Ethiopian-Born Journalist by Danny Adeno Abebe, translated by Eylon Levy
 Hidden Heretics: Jewish Doubt in the Digital Age by Ayala Fader

2020 
The nominees were announced on April 3, 2020. The winners were announced on May 12, 2020.

  Kafka's Last Trial: The Case of a Literary Legacy by Benjamin Balint
 Tehran Children: A Holocaust Refugee Odyssey by Mikhal Dekel
 Here All Along: Finding Meaning, Spirituality, and a Deeper Connection to Life--in Judaism (After Finally Choosing to Look There) by Sarah Hurwitz
 Shadow Strike: Inside Israel's Secret Mission to Eliminate Syrian Nuclear Power by Yaakov Katz

2019
The nominees were announced on 1 April 2019. The winners were announced on 1 May 2019.
  The Last Watchman of Old Cairo by Michael David Lukas
  The Words We Think We Know by Dalia Rosenfeld
 The Weight of Ink by Rachel Kadish
 Memento Park by Mark Sarvas
 Underground Fugue by Margot Singer

2018
The nominees were announced on 30 April 2018. The winners were announced on 25 June 2018.
  If All the Seas Were Ink: A Memoir by Ilana Kurshan
  City on a Hilltop: American Jews and the Israeli Settler Movement by Sara Yael Hirschhorn
 The Many Deaths of Jew Süss: The Notorious Trial and Execution of an Eighteenth-Century Court Jew by Yair Mintzker
 Jews on the Frontier: Religion and Mobility in Nineteenth-Century America by Shari Rabin
 The Lost Book of Moses: The Hunt For The World’s Oldest Bible by Chanan Tigay

2017
The finalists were announced April 3, 2017. The awardees were announced May 3, 2017.
  Ways to Disappear by Idra Novey
  The Last Flight of Poxl West: A Novel by Daniel Torday
 The Yid by Paul Goldberg
 Inherited Disorders: Stories, Parables & Problems by Adam Ehrlich Sachs
 The Bed Moved: Stories by Rebecca Schiff

2016
The winners were awarded on 5 June 2016.
  The Archive Thief: The Man Who Salvaged French Jewish History in the Wake of the Holocaust by Lisa Leff
  Rav Kook: Mystic in a Time of Revolution by Yehuda Mirsky
 Killing a King: The Assassination of Yitzhak Rabin and the Remaking of Israel by Dan Ephron
 The Grammar of God: A Journey into the Words and Worlds of the Bible by Aviyah Kushner
 The Rag Race: How Jews Sewed Their Way to Success in America and the British Empire by Adam Mendelsohn

2015
The finalists were announced in January 2015. The awardees were announced in February 2015.
   The Best Place on Earth by Ayelet Tsabari
   The Lion Seeker by Kenneth Bonert
 Panic in a Suitcase by Yelena Akhtiorskaya
 The UnAmericans by Molly Antopol
 A Replacement Life by Boris Fishman

2014
The finalists were announced on November 7, 2013. The winners were declared in January 2014.
   The Aleppo Codex: A True Story of Obsession, Faith, and the Pursuit of an Ancient Bible, by Matti Friedman
   Becoming Frum: How Newcomers Learn the Language and Culture of Orthodox Judaism, by Sarah Bunin Benor
 Jews and Booze: Becoming American in the Age of Prohibition, by Marni Davis
 Embodying Hebrew Culture: Aesthetics, Athletics, and Dance in the Jewish Community of Mandate Palestine, by Nina S. Spiegel
 The Genius: Elijah of Vilna and the Making of Modern Judaism, by Eliyahu Stern

2013
The winners were announced on April 9, 2013.
   The Innocents, by Francesca Segal
  Leaving the Atocha Station, by Ben Lerner
 The People of Forever Are Not Afraid, by Shani Boianjiu
 The Book of Life, by Stuart Nadler
 Motti, by Asaf Schurr

2012
The winners were announced on February 15, 2012.
  When They Come for Us, We’ll Be Gone: The Epic Struggle to Save Soviet Jewry, by Gal Beckerman
  Moses Montefiore:  Jewish Liberator, Imperial Hero, by  Abigail Green
 A Thousand Darknesses:  Lies and Truth in Holocaust Fiction, by Ruth Franklin
 The Benderly Boys and American Jewish Education, by Jonathan B. Krasner
 The Most Musical Nation:  Jews and Culture in the Late Russian Empire, by James Loeffler

2011
The winners were announced on March 24, 2011.
  The Jump Artist, by Austin Ratner
  A Curable Romantic, by Joseph Skibell
 Stations West, by Allison Amend
 The Cosmopolitans, Nadia Kalman
 The Invisible Bridge, Julie Orringer

2010
The winners were announced on January 26, 2010. The judges were unable to decide on the top honour, so the prize was shared and the runner-up prize eliminated.
  Jewish Renaissance in the Russian Revolution, by Kenneth B. Moss
  Plumes: Ostrich Feathers, Jews, and a Lost World of Global Commerce, by Sarah Abrevaya Stein
 Speaking of Jews: Rabbis, Intellectuals, and the Creation of an American Public Identity, by Lila Corwin Berman
 Station Identification: A Cultural History of Yiddish Radio in the United States, by Ari Y. Kelman
 Surprised by God: How I Learned to Stop Worrying and Love Religion, by Danya Ruttenberg

2009
The winners were announced on March 25, 2009.
  One More Year, by Sana Krasikov
  The Septembers of Shiraz, by Dalia Sofer
 The Book of Dahlia, by Elisa Albert
 The Rowing Lesson, by Anne Landsman
 Petropolis, by Anya Ulinich

2008
The winners were announced on February 13, 2008.
  The Man in the White Sharkskin Suit, by Lucette Lagnado
  Houses of Study, by Ilana Blumberg
  The Price of Whiteness, by Eric Goldstein
 Churchill's Promised Land, by Michael Makovsky
 A Crack in the Earth, by Haim Watzman

2007
The winners were announced in March 2007.
  The Genizah at the House of Shepher, by Tamar Yellin
  Our Holocaust, by Amir Gutfreund
  Not Me, by Michael Lavigne
 Disobedience, by Naomi Alderman
 Accidents, by Yael Hedaya

References

External links
 https://www.samirohrprize.org/

Awards established in 2006
International literary awards
Fiction awards
2006 establishments in the United States
Jewish literary awards